Indeterminate Activity of Resultant Masses is a CD release by Glenn Branca from 2007, recorded in 1982. The CD also features an interview by Wim Mertens with John Cage who gives a very negative opinion about the music of Glenn Branca. The CD was released by Atavistic Records.

Track listing
 Indeterminate Activity of Resultant Masses (1982) - 31:11
 So That Each Person is in Charge of Himself (1982 interview with John Cage) - 18:47
 Harmonic Series Chords (1989) - 7:16

References

Glenn Branca albums
1980 live albums
Atavistic Records albums